Moominvalley (also known as just Moomin) is a 2019 animated family drama series. An adaptation of the classic Moomin books and comics by writer-illustrator Tove Jansson and her brother Lars Jansson, it is created using new techniques in 3D CGI.

Finnish production company Gutsy Animations ran a crowdfunding campaign on Indiegogo from 8 March to 21 April 2017. The campaign was organised in order to raise funds towards visual development of the series. Animation company Anima Vitae was appointed as the lead animation company for the first two seasons of the series. The series attracted over 2.1 million Finns and has become the most watched show ever on Yle Areena streaming platform and the most watched television series of 2019 in the whole of Finland. The series has 16 million streams on Yle Areena.

The series is Finland's most expensive television show with a €20 million budget. In 2019, the series' first episode was the most watched program on Finnish national broadcaster Yle's streaming service Yle Areena.

Synopsis
The protagonist of the series is Moomintroll, who is curious, kind, sensitive and idealistic. He is a typical hero in a coming-of-age story: he tries to tackle the puzzle of growing up to his true, individualistic self while remaining a beloved part of the family. He lives with his caring Moominmamma and nostalgic Moominpappa. Moomintroll is joined by his best friend, the free-spirited wanderer Snufkin, the chaotic Little My, daydreamer Snorkmaiden, cowardly Sniff, and many other friends.

Cast and characters

Music

Original score music
The original score for the series is composed by world-renowned Finnish musicians, classical violinist Pekka Kuusisto and percussionist Samuli Kosminen, with Jarmo Saari joining them in season 2. The Music supervisor for the series is Virpi Immonen. Kuusisto's father, Ilkka Kuusisto, had previously composed an opera for the Moomins with Tove Jansson in 1974. The official soundtrack was released on 19 April 2019.

Official soundtrack, season 1
The series also includes episodic songs which are produced in collaboration with Columbia Records and Sony Music Entertainment. The official soundtrack for the Moominvalley TV series (released on 19 April 2019) includes 16 original recordings from a line-up of artists including Tom Odell, First Aid Kit, Alma, Delilah Montagu, Declan McKenna, MØ, SOAK and many more.

A limited edition 12" picture disc on clear vinyl was made available in four colourways, each featuring a different Moomin character. It was also released on 19 April 2019.

Official soundtrack, season 2
The second season includes nine original songs from up-and-coming artists such as Cavetown, girl in red, Jesse Markin and jens. The official soundtrack album, created in collaboration with Sony Music Finland, was released on 10 April 2020 globally on the major streaming platforms (Spotify, Deezer, Apple Music, Google Play and Tidal).

Episodes

Series overview

Season 1 (2019)

Season 2 (2019–2020)
The first two episodes of season two were screened at Finnkino cinemas in Finland on 2 February 2020, exactly a month before these episodes premiered on Yle TV2 and Yle Areena on 2 March 2020.

Season 3 (2022)

Season 4 (2024)

International broadcast
Moominvalley has been sold to more than 60 countries. Moominvalley first aired on Yle TV2 in Finland on 25 February 2019, and a day after in Swedish on Yle Teema & Fem. It began airing in the United Kingdom on Sky One, Sky Kids and NOW TV on 19 April 2019. The first eight episodes aired overnight between 2:00 and 6:00 am, and were then repeated in pairs between 5:30 and 6:30 pm over the Easter weekend from 19 to 22 April. Episodes 9–11 followed on the afternoon of 27 April, and 12–13 on 28 April. The first five episodes of season 2 aired over the weekend before Christmas 2019, with the remainder broadcast over the following Easter weekend, 10–13 April 2020. Japan's national broadcaster NHK premiered Moominvalley on its BS4K channel on 4 April 2019. The series has also been sold to China. On 9 August 2019 it launched on WildBrain's YouTube channel. In November 2020 it was announced that Moominvalley had been recommissioned for a third season by anchor broadcasters Yle in Finland and Sky in the UK. The first eight episodes aired on Sky Showcase in pairs from Good Friday 2022 (15 April) until Easter Monday (18 April), with the remainder scheduled, also in pairs until the final episode, for subsequent Sundays.

On 1 May 2019 PGS Entertainment acquired the distribution rights to Moominvalley.

In the United Kingdom, the series also airs on BBC Alba as part of the CBBC Alba block, where it is dubbed in Scottish Gaelic.

Reception

Ratings
The series has been extremely successful in its reviews and ratings worldwide. The first episode of Moominvalley was viewed by 600,000 viewers when it premiered in Finland's Yle TV2 in February 2019. It also became the most watched television series episode of all time in Yle's streaming service, Yle Areena, bringing the total viewership of the first episode in Finland to over two million. Moominvalley was the most watched TV series and the fourth most watched TV programme in Finland in 2019 (incl. all channels).

Awards
In 2019 Moominvalley was awarded the Best Animated Kid's Programme at TBI's Content Innovation Awards. The series also won a Golden Venla award for 2019 Best Children's Program and won Best Children’s Series at 2020 British Animation Awards. Moominvalley was nominated for Best Animation and Best Storytelling at 2019 Shanghai Television Festival. In 2020 Moominvalley was a New York International Children's Film Festival nominee and additionally, nominated for the best Children's animation at Banff Rockie Awards. Moominvalley was shortlisted for Broadcast Digital Awards in 2020 and selected for Encounters' Film Festival's competition programme in the same year. It was nominated for an International Emmy Kids Award. In 2020 Moominvalley was nominated for Best Children's Program in Golden Venla Awards for the second year around.

References

External links

Moominvalley on Moomin.com

Moomin television series
2019 British television series debuts
2010s British animated television series
2020s British animated television series
British children's animated drama television series
Finnish children's animated drama television series
English-language television shows
Sky UK original programming
British computer-animated television series